Srećko Lušić (born 2 January 1959) is a Croatian footballer and later football manager.

Managerial career
In November 2008, Lušić was sacked as manager of Cibalia.
He was dismissed as manager of Karlovac in September 2011, after he had replaced Igor Pamic six months earlier.

References

1959 births
Living people
People from Doboj
Croats of Bosnia and Herzegovina
Association footballers not categorized by position
Yugoslav footballers
HNK Cibalia players
Croatian football managers
HNK Cibalia managers
NK Brotnjo managers
NK Croatia Sesvete managers
NK Karlovac managers
NK Rudeš managers
Croatian Football League managers
Croatian expatriate football managers
Expatriate football managers in Bosnia and Herzegovina
Croatian expatriate sportspeople in Bosnia and Herzegovina
Expatriate football managers in Slovenia
Croatian expatriate sportspeople in Slovenia